Mohammad Zuhdi Nashashibi (1925 – 27 January 2020), also known as Abu Zuhdi, was a banker and politician from the West Bank. He was the first Finance Minister of the Palestinian National Authority. He served the post from 1994 to 2002.

Biography
Zuhdi Nashashibi was born on 1925 in Jerusalem in a Nashashibi family. He worked in Commercial Bank of Syria. 

Zuhdi Nashashibi started his career at Syrian Ba'ath Party in early sixties. Later, he became a member of the executive council of Palestine Liberation Organization. He became the head of its economics department. He was the chairman of Palestinian National Fund too. 

Zuhdi Nashashibi returned to his homeland after Oslo Accords in 1994. He was appointed as the Finance Minister of the Palestinian National Authority in that year. He served in that post till 2002.

Zuhdi Nashashibi died on 27 January 2020 at the age of 95.

References

1925 births
2020 deaths
Finance ministers of the Palestinian National Authority
Government ministers of the Palestinian National Authority
Fatah members
Palestinian bankers
People from Jerusalem
Burials at Sahab Cemetery
Members of the Executive Committee of the Palestine Liberation Organization